The Moderates or Moderate Republicans, pejoratively labeled Opportunist Republicans, was a French political group active in the late 19th century during the Third French Republic. The leaders of the group included Adolphe Thiers, Jules Ferry, Jules Grévy, Henri Wallon and René Waldeck-Rousseau.

Although considered leftist at the time, the Opportunist Republicans progressively evolved into a centre-right political party. During their existence, the Moderate Republicans were present in the French Parliament first under the name of Republican Left and after a fusion with radical republicans as the Democratic Union.

They were further divided into the National Republican Association and the Liberal Republican Union in 1888 and 1889, respectively.

History

Origins 
The Moderate Republicans were a large and heterogenous group started after the French Revolution of 1848. However, the group lost the legislative elections of 1849, finishing as the minority group in the National Assembly. After the Louis-Napoléon's coup d'état in 1851 and the birth of the Second French Empire in 1852, the Republicans took part in the parliamentary opposition along with the monarchists against the Bonapartist majority.

Divisions 

After the Franco-Prussian War (1870–1871) and the consequential fall of the French Empire, the Third French Republic was born. However, its politics was divided in two groups, namely the right-wing monarchists (Orléanists and Legitimists) and the left-wing republicans (radicals and moderates). If both republicans were combined by anti-clericalism and social reformism, the radicals were mostly nationalist and anti-German, refusing the Treaty of Versailles with Prussia. The moderates instead supported the Treaty and were more pragmatic on international politics. After the legislative elections of 1871, the republicans inside the Chamber of Deputies split in two groups, namely the moderate Republican Left led by Jules Favre and the radical Republican Union led by Léon Gambetta. The two parliamentary groups were non-influential during the early years of the Republic, dominated by the monarchist Moral Order coalition of Patrice MacMahon, but after the failure of a return to the monarchy and after the legislative elections of 1876 the moderate and radical republicans gained 193 and 98 seats in the Chamber, respectively. From this time, the republicans maintained strong majorities in the French Parliament and were pejoratively called Opportunists by their detractors for their aptitude to gain the popular consensus in spite of any ideology.

Moving to the right 

In January 1879, the Republican Jules Grévy was elected as President of the Republic, succeeding the Monarchist MacMahon. From this time, with the progressive disappearance of the Monarchists the moderates began to move toward the parliamentary centre between the old rights (Bonapartist and reunited monarchists) and the new lefts (radical-socialists, Marxists and Blanquists). To prevent the creation of a socialist state, the two radical and moderate republicans spirits decided to cooperate and form common governments despite the personal antagonism between Grévy and Gambetta, who died in 1882.

During the late 1870s and 1880s, the Republican majority launched an education reform with the Bert Law, creating the normal schools; and the Ferry Laws, that secularize public education. However, Grévy also signed the so-called Lois scélérates ("villainous laws") that restricted the freedom of the press and France started a colonial expansion in Africa, creating protectorates in Madagascar and Tunisia. Despite this semi-authoritarian policies, the republicans refused to be charged with conservatism and continued to proclaim themselves of the left, republicanism in France being historically associated with the left-wing. This paradox was later identified as sinistrisme ("leftism").

In the legislative elections of 1885, the republican consolidation was confirmed. Even if popularly won by the Conservative Union of Armand de Mackau, the elections guaranteed a solid republican majority in the Chamber. In fact, until the election the two republican groups had been reunited in a new political party guided by President Grévy and his close ally Jules Ferry, namely the Democratic Union, born of the fusion of the Republican Left and the Republican Union. However, the republican Prime Minister Ferry was forced to resign in 1885 after a political scandal known as the Tonkin Affair and President Grévy also resigned his office in 1887 after a corruption scandal involving his son-in-law. The Moderate Republicans, seriously challenged, survived only thanks to the support of the Radical Republicans of René Goblet and worries about the rise of a new political phenomenon called revanchism, the desire for revenge against the German Empire after the defeat of 1871.

Final divisions and decline 

The revanchist ideas were strong in the France of the Belle Époque and with the scandals involving the republican governments there was a rise of the nationalist party led by General Georges Boulanger. Boulanger was Minister of War from 1886 to 1887. His appointment was a strategy of Prime Minister Goblet to pledge the nationalists, but after the fall of his cabinet he was replaced by Maurice Rouvier and the General was not reconfirmed. This political error started the political phase called Boulangisme (1887–1891). Around the General was forming a heterogeneous group of supporters, including radical reformers like Georges Clemenceau and Charles de Freycinet; Bonapartists and monarchists who wanted to overthrow the Republic; socialists like Édouard Vaillant, who admired the General's views on workers' rights; and nationalists who desired revenge against Germany. Finally, Boulanger personally led the League of Patriots, a far-right revanchist and militarist league and benefitted from popular and financial support by workers and aristocrats, respectively.

In the face of the rise of Boulanger, the republican leaders were divided. From one side, the old republican moderate wing, composed by prominent personalities like Jules Ferry, Maurice Rouvier and Eugène Spuller, representing the middle bourgeoisie, industrialists and scholars, formed the National Republican Association (ANR) in 1888. To the other side, the republican right-wing of Henri Barboux and Léon Say, who represented the interests of the rich bourgeoisie and Catholics, formed the Liberal Republican Union in 1889. Continuing to depict itself as leftist, the ANR was a conservative group opposing the income tax and strikes that tried to defend the Republic from its reputed enemy Boulanger and used many banquets to finance his activities. Finally, there was a rupture inside the Boulangist party, namely the Radicals of Clemenceau, who disenchanted by the militarism of Boulanger launched the Society of the Rights of Man and of the Citizen and the socialists became disappointed by Boulanger's frequentation of monarchists like the Duchess of Uzès and Prince Napoléon Bonaparte, also themselves disappointed by Boulanger's republican ideas. The coup de grâce to Boulangisme arrived when he was accused of preparing a coup d'état, causing his flight to Brussels and a republican landslide in the 1889.

In the 1890s, the Opportunist republican parable ended as the Panama scandals of 1892 involved prominent Radical politicians like Clemenceau, Alfred Naquet and Léon Bourgeois, granting a large victory to the ANR in the legislative elections the following year. However, the Dreyfus affair broke out in 1893, causing the formation of two factions, namely the Dreyfusards like Émile Zola, Anatole France and Clemenceau who supported the innocence of the Jewish Colonel and the Anti-Dreyfusard like Édouard Drumont, Jules Méline and Raymond Poincaré who accused Dreyfus of betrayal, partially due to rampant antisemitism. The ANR, which Méline and Poincaré were members of, refused the antisemitic thesis, but took side with the Anti-Dreyfus field. This decision was fatal for the ANR's destiny. In 1899, the re-conviction of the Colonel Dreyfus, with a partial pardon favored by the republican Pierre Waldeck-Rousseau, caused divisions inside the ANR, aggravated by the rehabilitation of Dreyfus in 1900. To remove the mole of antisemitism, Waldeck-Rousseau founded the Democratic Republican Alliance (ADR) in 1901, claiming the heritage of Ferry and Gambetta. Many Moderate Republicans joined the ADR, including Yves Guyot, Ferdinand Dreyfus (not linked with the Colonel), Narcisse Leven and David Raynal. The Moderate Republicans who had remained in the ANR finally adhered along with Progressive Republicans to the Republican Federation, a right-wing party very distant from the original ANR's beliefs.

Prominent members 
 Édouard Barbey
 Frédéric Auguste Bartholdi
 Louis Barthou
 Marie François Sadi Carnot
 Jean Casimir-Perier
 Jacques Godefroy Cavaignac
 Gustave Denis
 Paul Deschanel
 Paul Devès
 Ferdinand Dreyfus
 Jules Armand Dufaure
 Armand Fallières
 Charles Ferry
 Jules Ferry
 Charles Friedel
 Jules Grévy
 James de Kerjégu
 Narcisse Leven
 Georges Leygues
 Émile Loubet
 Jean Macé
 Louis Marchegay
 Émile Maruéjouls
 Félix Martin-Feuillée
 Alfred Mézières
 Victor Milliard
 Raymond Poincaré
 David Raynal
 Joseph Reinach
 Maurice Rouvier
 Jules Siegfried
 Eugène Spuller
 Ludovic Trarieux
 Georges Trouillot
 Louis-Léger Vauthier
 Geoffroy Velten
 René Waldeck-Rousseau
 Henri-Alexandre Wallon

Electoral results

Presidential elections

Legislative elections

See also 
 France during the 19th century
 History of the Left in France
 Opportunism
 Politics of France

Bibliography 
 Abel Bonnard (1936). Les Modérés. Grasset. 330 p.
 Francois Roth (dir.) (2003). Les modérés dans la vie politique française (1870-1965). Nancy: University of Nancy Press. 562 p. .
 Gilles Dumont, Bernard Dumont and Christophe Réveillard (dir.) (2007). La culture du refus de l’ennemi. Modérantisme et religion au seuil du XXIe siècle. University of Limoges Press. Bibliothèque européenne des idées. 150 p.

References 

 
Political parties established in 1871
Political parties disestablished in 1901
Political parties of the French Third Republic
Defunct political parties in France
Defunct liberal political parties
Anti-clerical parties
Centre-left parties in Europe
Conservative liberal parties
Left-wing parties in France
Liberal conservative parties
Liberal parties in France
Progressive parties
Radical parties in France
Republicanism in France